The annual Greg Spira Memorial  Internet Baseball Awards (IBA) are based on fan voting. They were founded in 1991 by Greg Spira with the Most Valuable Player, Cy Young (now Pitcher of the Year), and Rookie of the Year awards, in each of the two leagues in Major League Baseball. In 1998, an award for Manager of the Year was added in each league.  Spira managed the awards until his death at the end of 2011. The awards were then named in his memory.

Winners
Since 1998, eight awards have been given each year. From 1991 to 1997, there were six awards each year.

1991–1999
See footnote

1991
Most Valuable Player, AL: Cal Ripken, Orioles
Most Valuable Player, NL: Barry Bonds, Pirates
Cy Young, AL: Roger Clemens, Red Sox
Cy Young, NL: Tom Glavine, Braves
Rookie of the Year, AL: Chuck Knoblauch, Twins
Rookie of the Year, NL: Jeff Bagwell, Astros

1992
Most Valuable Player, AL: Frank Thomas
Most Valuable Player, NL: Barry Bonds
Cy Young, AL: Roger Clemens
Cy Young, NL: Greg Maddux
Rookie of the Year, AL: Pat Listach
Rookie of the Year, NL: Reggie Sanders

1993
Most Valuable Player, AL: Frank Thomas
Most Valuable Player, NL: Barry Bonds
Cy Young, AL: Kevin Appier
Cy Young, NL: Greg Maddux
Rookie of the Year, AL: Tim Salmon
Rookie of the Year, NL: Mike Piazza

1995
Most Valuable Player, AL: Albert Belle
Most Valuable Player, NL: Greg Maddux
Cy Young, AL: Randy Johnson
Cy Young, NL: Greg Maddux
Rookie of the Year, AL: Garret Anderson
Rookie of the Year, NL: Hideo Nomo

1996
Most Valuable Player, AL: Alex Rodriguez
Most Valuable Player, NL: Mike Piazza
Cy Young, AL: Pat Hentgen
Cy Young, NL: Kevin Brown
Rookie of the Year, AL: Derek Jeter
Rookie of the Year, NL: Édgar Rentería

1997
Most Valuable Player, AL: Ken Griffey
Most Valuable Player, NL: Mike Piazza
Cy Young, AL: Roger Clemens
Cy Young, NL: Pedro Martínez
Rookie of the Year, AL: Nomar Garciaparra
Rookie of the Year, NL: Scott Rolen

1998
Most Valuable Player, AL: Nomar Garciaparra
Most Valuable Player, NL: Mark McGwire
Cy Young, AL: Roger Clemens
Cy Young, NL: Greg Maddux
Rookie of the Year, AL: Ben Grieve
Rookie of the Year, NL: Kerry Wood
Manager of the Year, AL: Joe Torre
Manager of the Year, NL: Larry Dierker

1999
Most Valuable Player, AL: Pedro Martínez
Most Valuable Player, NL: Chipper Jones
Cy Young, AL: Pedro Martínez
Cy Young, NL: Randy Johnson
Rookie of the Year, AL: Carlos Beltrán
Rookie of the Year, NL: Scott Williamson
Manager of the Year, AL: Jimmy Williams
Manager of the Year, NL: Bobby Cox

Team of the Decade (1990–1999)

MVP
Barry Bonds, Pirates–Giants

Infield
Catcher: Mike Piazza, Dodgers–Marlins–Mets
First Base: Mark McGwire, Athletics–Cardinals
Second Base: Roberto Alomar, Padres–Blue Jays–Orioles–Indians
Shortstop: Barry Larkin, Reds
Third Base: Matt Williams, Giants–Indians–Diamondbacks

Outfield
Left Field: Barry Bonds, Pirates–Giants
Center Field: Ken Griffey Jr., Mariners
Right Field: Tony Gwynn, Padres
Designated Hitter (AL): Edgar Martínez, Mariners

Rotation (top 5 starting pitchers)
Pitcher of the Decade: Greg Maddux, Cubs–Braves
Roger Clemens, Red Sox–Blue Jays–Yankees
Randy Johnson, Expos–Mariners–Astros–Diamondbacks
Tom Glavine, Braves
Pedro Martínez, Dodgers–Expos–Red Sox

Bullpen (top 6 relief pitchers)
Reliever of the Decade: Dennis Eckersley, Athletics–Cardinals–Red Sox
Trevor Hoffman, Marlins–Padres
John Wetteland, Dodgers–Expos–Yankees–Rangers
John Franco, Mets
Jeff Montgomery, Royals
Randy Myers, Reds–Padres–Cubs–Orioles–Blue Jays

2000–2009
See footnote

2000
Most Valuable Player, AL: Jason Giambi
Most Valuable Player, NL: Barry Bonds
Cy Young, AL: Pedro Martínez
Cy Young, NL: Randy Johnson
Rookie of the Year, AL: Kazuhiro Sasaki
Rookie of the Year, NL: Rick Ankiel
Manager of the Year, AL: Jerry Manuel
Manager of the Year, NL: Dusty Baker

2001
Most Valuable Player, AL: Jason Giambi, Athletics
Most Valuable Player, NL: Barry Bonds, Giants
Cy Young, AL: Freddy García, Mariners
Cy Young, NL: Randy Johnson, Diamondbacks
Rookie of the Year, AL: Ichiro Suzuki, Mariners
Rookie of the Year, NL: Albert Pujols, Cardinals
Manager of the Year, AL: Lou Piniella, Mariners
Manager of the Year, NL: Larry Bowa, Phillies

2002
Most Valuable Player, AL: Alex Rodriguez
Most Valuable Player, NL: Barry Bonds
Cy Young, AL: Pedro Martínez
Cy Young, NL: Randy Johnson
Rookie of the Year, AL: Eric Hinske
Rookie of the Year, NL: Jason Jennings
Manager of the Year, AL: Mike Scioscia
Manager of the Year, NL: Jim Tracy

2003
Most Valuable Player, AL: Alex Rodriguez, Rangers
Most Valuable Player, NL: Barry Bonds, Giants
Cy Young, AL: Roy Halladay, Blue Jays
Cy Young, NL: Mark Prior, Cubs
Rookie of the Year, AL: Ángel Berroa, Royals
Rookie of the Year, NL: Brandon Webb, Diamondbacks
Manager of the Year, AL: Tony Peña, Royals
Manager of the Year, NL: Jack McKeon, Marlins

2004
Most Valuable Player, AL: Vladimir Guerrero
Most Valuable Player, NL: Barry Bonds
Cy Young, AL: Johan Santana
Cy Young, NL: Randy Johnson
Rookie of the Year, AL: Bobby Crosby
Rookie of the Year, NL: Jason Bay
Manager of the Year, AL: Buck Showalter
Manager of the Year, NL: Bobby Cox

2005
Most Valuable Player, AL: Alex Rodriguez, Yankees
Most Valuable Player, NL: Albert Pujols, Cardinals
Cy Young, AL: Johan Santana, Twins
Cy Young, NL: Roger Clemens, Astros
Rookie of the Year, AL: Huston Street, Athletics
Rookie of the Year, NL: Ryan Howard, Phillies
Manager of the Year, AL: Ozzie Guillén, White Sox
Manager of the Year, NL: Bobby Cox, Braves

2006
Most Valuable Player, AL: Derek Jeter
Most Valuable Player, NL: Albert Pujols
Cy Young, AL: Johan Santana
Cy Young, NL: Brandon Webb
Rookie of the Year, AL: Francisco Liriano
Rookie of the Year, NL: Hanley Ramírez
Manager of the Year, AL: Jim Leyland
Manager of the Year, NL: Joe Girardi

2007
See footnote
Most Valuable Player, AL: Alex Rodriguez
Most Valuable Player, NL: Matt Holliday
Cy Young, AL: CC Sabathia
Cy Young, NL: Jake Peavy
Rookie of the Year, AL: Dustin Pedroia
Rookie of the Year, NL: Ryan Braun
Manager of the Year, AL: Eric Wedge
Manager of the Year, NL: Clint Hurdle

2008
Most Valuable Player, AL: Dustin Pedroia
Most Valuable Player, NL: Albert Pujols
Cy Young, AL: Cliff Lee
Cy Young, NL: Tim Lincecum
Rookie of the Year, AL: Evan Longoria
Rookie of the Year, NL: Geovany Soto
Manager of the Year, AL: Joe Maddon
Manager of the Year, NL: Lou Piniella

2009
See footnotes
Most Valuable Player, AL: Joe Mauer
Most Valuable Player, NL: Albert Pujols
Cy Young, AL: Zack Greinke
Cy Young, NL: Tim Lincecum
Rookie of the Year, AL: Rick Porcello
Rookie of the Year, NL: Tommy Hanson
Manager of the Year, AL: Mike Scioscia
Manager of the Year, NL: Jim Tracy

2010–2019

2010
See footnotes
Most Valuable Player, AL: Josh Hamilton, Rangers
Most Valuable Player, NL: Joey Votto, Reds
Cy Young, AL: Félix Hernández, Mariners
Cy Young, NL: Roy Halladay, Phillies
Rookie of the Year, AL: Neftalí Feliz, Rangers
Rookie of the Year, NL: Buster Posey, Giants
Manager of the Year, AL: Ron Washington, Rangers
Manager of the Year, NL: Bud Black, Padres

2011
See footnotes
Most Valuable Player, AL: José Bautista, Blue Jays
Most Valuable Player, NL:: Matt Kemp, Dodgers
Cy Young, AL: Justin Verlander, Tigers
Cy Young, NL: Clayton Kershaw, Dodgers
Rookie of the Year, AL: Michael Pineda, Mariners
Rookie of the Year, NL: Craig Kimbrel, Braves
Manager of the Year, AL: Joe Maddon, Rays
Manager of the Year, NL: Kirk Gibson, Diamondbacks

2012
See footnotes
Most Valuable Player, AL: Mike Trout, Angels
Most Valuable Player, NL:: Buster Posey, Giants
Cy Young, AL: Justin Verlander, Tigers
Cy Young, NL: R. A. Dickey, Mets
Rookie of the Year, AL: Mike Trout, Angels
Rookie of the Year, NL: Bryce Harper, Nationals
Manager of the Year, AL: Buck Showalter, Orioles
Manager of the Year, NL: Davey Johnson, Nationals

2013
Most Valuable Player, AL: Mike Trout, Angels
Most Valuable Player, NL: Andrew McCutchen, Pirates
Cy Young, AL: Max Scherzer, Tigers
Cy Young, NL: Clayton Kershaw, Dodgers
Rookie of the Year, AL: Wil Myers, Rays
Rookie of the Year, NL: Jose Fernández, Marlins
Manager of the Year, AL: John Farrell, Red Sox
Manager of the Year, NL: Clint Hurdle, Pirates

2014
See footnote
Most Valuable Player, AL: Mike Trout, Angels
Most Valuable Player, NL: Clayton Kershaw, Dodgers
Pitcher of the Year, AL: Corey Kluber, Indians
Pitcher of the Year, NL: Clayton Kershaw, Dodgers
Rookie of the Year, AL: José Abreu, White Sox
Rookie of the Year, NL: Jacob deGrom, Mets
Manager of the Year, AL: Buck Showalter, Orioles
Manager of the Year, NL: Clint Hurdle, Pirates

2015
See footnote
Most Valuable Player, AL: Josh Donaldson, Blue Jays
Most Valuable Player, NL: Bryce Harper, Nationals
Pitcher of the Year, AL: Dallas Keuchel, Astros
Pitcher of the Year, NL: Jake Arrieta, Cubs
Rookie of the Year, AL: Carlos Correa, Astros
Rookie of the Year, NL: Kris Bryant, Cubs
Manager of the Year, AL: A. J. Hinch, Astros
Manager of the Year, NL: Joe Maddon, Cubs

2016
See footnote
Most Valuable Player, AL: Mike Trout, Angels
Most Valuable Player, NL: Kris Bryant, Cubs
Pitcher of the Year, AL: Justin Verlander, Tigers
Pitcher of the Year, NL: Max Scherzer, Nationals
Rookie of the Year, AL: Michael Fulmer, Tigers
Rookie of the Year, NL: Corey Seager, Dodgers
Manager of the Year, AL: Terry Francona, Indians
Manager of the Year, NL: Joe Maddon, Cubs

2017
Was not held

See also
Baseball awards#U.S. major leagues: Awards by organizations other than MLB
List of MLB awards
Esurance MLB Awards (including Major Leaguer, Hitter, Pitcher, Defensive Player, Rookie, Manager)
Triple Crown (baseball)
MLB All-Century Team (1999)
MLB All-Time Team (1997; Baseball Writers' Association of America)

Footnotes

External links
Internet Baseball Awards

Major League Baseball trophies and awards
Awards established in 1991
1991 establishments in the United States